London Poppy Day is an annual event organised by the Royal British Legion which aims to raise £1million for its Poppy Appeal. Launched in 2006, the event takes place in London on the first Thursday of November, and is one of several similar events held in cities around the United Kingdom. The day sees volunteers and armed forces veterans selling poppy merchandise to raise funds at venues such as railway stations on the London Underground and in offices, as well as entertainment provided by military bands.

In October 2022, and following the announcement of a series of strikes by the National Union of Rail, Maritime and Transport Workers (RMT), the Royal British Legion cancelled that year's London Poppy Day, scheduled for 3 November, a day on which one of the strikes would fall. The Royal British Legion said it would look at alternative ways to "lessen the impact" of the financial loss cancelling the event would cause. The RMT subsequently cancelled the 3 November strike to avoid the event.

References

External links
London Poppy Day at Royal British Legion 

2006 establishments in the United Kingdom
November observances
Annual events in London
The Royal British Legion